Taylor Townsend was the defending champion, and successfully defended her title, defeating Whitney Osuigwe in the final, 6–4, 6–4.

Seeds

Draw

Finals

Top half

Bottom half

References

Main Draw

LTP Charleston Pro Tennis - Singles